Sulforhodamine 101 (SR101) is a red fluorescent dye.  In neurophysiological experiments which comprise calcium imaging methods, it can be used for a counterstaining of astrocytes to be able to analyze data from neurons separately.  However, in addition to labeling astrocytes, SR101 labels myelinating oligodendrocytes.  SR101 has been reported to affect excitability of neurons and should therefore be used with caution.

A sulfonyl chloride derivative of sulforhodamine 101, known as Texas Red, is used for conjugation to a number of functional groups, especially primary amines.

References

Benzenesulfonates
Rhodamine dyes
Nitrogen heterocycles
Oxygen heterocycles